The 2020 MLS Expansion Draft was a special draft for the Major League Soccer expansion team Austin FC that was held on December 15, 2020. The list of players available for selection was released on December 14, 2020.

Format
Teams who had players selected in the 2019 MLS Expansion Draft are exempt.  These teams are Atlanta United, FC Cincinnati, Columbus Crew, Los Angeles FC, Minnesota United, New England Revolution, New York City FC, Portland Timbers, Seattle Sounders, and Sporting Kansas City.  All other teams returning from the 2020 season are subject to the draft.  These teams have 12 protection slots that they may apply to any draft eligible player on their senior, supplemental, and reserve rosters. Players who have not graduated from Generation Adidas, and homegrown players age 25 and under as of the end of the 2020 season are not eligible for the draft.  Players with contracts expiring at the end of the season, designated players, and players with no-trade clauses are part of a team's roster and are eligible for the draft.  In the case of player's with no-trade clauses, a team must use one of their protection slots for that player.  If a team has a players selected in the draft, that team becomes exempt from any further picks in the draft.  The expansion team, Austin FC was given 5 picks for the draft.

Expansion Draft picks

Team-by-team-breakdown

Chicago Fire FC

Colorado Rapids

FC Dallas

D.C. United

Houston Dynamo FC

LA Galaxy

Inter Miami CF

Montreal Impact

Nashville SC

New York Red Bulls

Orlando City SC

Philadelphia Union

Real Salt Lake

San Jose Earthquakes

Toronto FC

Vancouver Whitecaps FC

References

External links 
 2020 MLS Expansion Draft

Major League Soccer Expansion Draft
Expansion
Austin FC
MLS Expansion Draft